Lover or lovers may refer to a person having a sexual or romantic relationship with someone outside marriage. In this context see: 
 Sexual partner
 Mistress (lover)
 Extramarital sex
 Premarital sex

Lover or Lovers may also refer to:

Geography
 Lover, Wiltshire, England
 Lover, Pennsylvania, US
 Lover, frazione of the comune of Campodenno, Trentino, Trentino-Alto Adige/Südtirol, Italy
 Lővér, the Hungarian name for Luieriu village, Suseni Commune, Mureș County, Romania

People
 Ed Lover or James Roberts (born 1963), American rapper, actor, musician and radio personality
 Eddy Lover or Eduardo Mosquera (born 1985), Panamanian singer-songwriter
 Latin Lover (wrestler) or Victor Manuel Resendiz Ruiz (born 1967), Mexican professional wrestler and actor
 Samuel Lover (1797–1868), Anglo-Irish songwriter, novelist and portraitist
 Seth Lover (1910–1997), American inventor of the humbucker
 Vector Lovers or Martin Wheeler, British musician

Film and television
 Lover (2018 film), an Indian Telugu-language film
 Lover (2022 film), an Indian Punjabi-language film
 Lovers (1927 film), an American silent film
 Lovers (1983 film), an Indian Hindi film by Bharathiraja
 Lovers (1991 film), a Spanish film noir
 Lovers (1999 film), a French film directed by Jean-Marc Barr
 Lovers (2013 film), or Another Life, a French film directed by Emmanuel Mouret
 Lovers (2014 film), an Indian Telugu-language romantic comedy film
 Lovers (2020 film), a French film directed by Nicole Garcia
 Lovers (TV series), a 2006 South Korean TV series
 "Lovers", a 1994 episode of the British sitcom Men Behaving Badly

Literature
 Lover (novel), by Bertha Harris, 1976
 Lovers (play), by Brian Friel, 1967

Music

Albums
 Lover (album) or its title song (see below) by Taylor Swift, 2019
 Lover or the title song, by George Maple, 2017
 Lover, by Morris Albert, 1999
 Lover, by Noah Gundersen, 2019
 Lovers (Babyface album) or the title song, 1986
 Lovers (Cannonball Adderley album) or the title song, 1975
 Lovers (David Murray album) or the title song, 1988
 Lovers (Dufresne album), 2008
 Lovers (Hanna Pakarinen album) or the title song, 2007
 Lovers (Mickey Newbury album) or the title song, 1975
 Lovers (Nels Cline album), 2016
 Lovers (The Sleepy Jackson album), 2003
 Lovers or the title song, by Anna of the North, 2017
 Lovers, by The Royalty, 2012

Songs
 "Lover" (Rodgers and Hart song), 1932
 "Lover" (Taylor Swift song), 2019
 "Lover", by AAA from AAA 10th Anniversary Best, 2015
 "Lover", by Digital Remedy, an Australian number-one club track of 2019
 "Lover", by G Flip from About Us, 2019
 "Lover", by Pnau from Pnau, 2007
 "Lover", by Rachel McFarlane, 1998
 "Lover", by Sophie Ellis-Bextor from Read My Lips, 2001
 "Lovers" (song), by the Tears, 2005
 "Lovers (Live a Little Longer)", by Abba, 1979
 "Lovers", by Deftones, the B-side of "Hexagram", 2003
 "Lovers", by Natalie Cole from Thankful, 1977
 "Lovers", from the film House of Flying Daggers, 2004
 "Lover", by the Michael Stanley Band from Heartland, 1980

Other uses
 Lover (clothing), a fashion label
 Lovers (stock characters) or Innamorati, in the commedia dell'arte theatre of 16th-century Italy
 Lovers rock, a style of reggae music

See also
 The Lover (disambiguation)
 The Lovers (disambiguation)